Jungsturm ('Young Storm') was a German language newspaper published from Kharkov, Ukrainian Soviet Socialist Republic. It was an organ of the Central Committee of the Leninist Young Communist League of Ukraine, and carried the by-line 'All-Ukraine German Youth Newspaper'. Jungsturm was published 1925–1936. It was published twice weekly.

As of January 1928, Jungsturm had a circulation of 2,500 copies, by January 1929 3,600 and by January 1930 the publication had a circulation of 4,250 copies. As of 1936, the editor of Jungsturm was Richard Knorre.

References

Newspapers published in Ukraine
Mass media in Kharkiv
Komsomol
German-language communist newspapers
1925 establishments in the Soviet Union
1936 disestablishments in the Soviet Union